Opposites Attract can refer to:

Music
 "Opposites Attract", a song by Paula Abdul
 "Opposites Attract", a track from Black Swan: Original Motion Picture Soundtrack
 "Opposites Attract (What They Like)", a track from Jealous Ones Still Envy (J.O.S.E.)

Television 
 "Opposites Attract (Dexter's Laboratory)", an episode of Dexter's Laboratory